CS Politehnica Iași is a Romanian sports society from Iași, Romania, founded in 1967.

External links 
Official website 

Sports clubs established in 1967
Multi-sport clubs in Romania
Sport in Iași
CS Politehnica Iasi
1967 establishments in Romania